Mild High Club is an American psychedelic pop group, led by the musician Alexander Brettin.

History 
Brettin grew up in the Midwest, playing flute in his school band. He majored in jazz studies at Columbia College in Chicago, and started Mild High Club in 2013. Brettin worked on Mild High Club's first album, Timeline, for almost three years until its release in 2015.

His sophomore LP, Skiptracing, was released in 2016. Pitchfork reviewed the album, stating Skiptracing is an improvement from Timeline, where "a more confident artist emerges with a fuller vision and voice."

On July 27, 2021, after nearly five years of waiting, Mild High Club's new album was announced, named Going, Going, Gone. This announcement was accompanied by a single from said album, "Me Myself and Dollar Hell". It was released on September 17, 2021.

"Homage", from the album Skiptracing, was certified Gold by RIAA in 2022.

Discography 
Timeline (2015)
Skiptracing (2016)
Sketches of Brunswick East (2017, with King Gizzard & the Lizard Wizard)
Going, Going, Gone (2021)

References

Psychedelic pop music groups
Stones Throw Records artists